Goodenia inundata is a species of flowering plant in the family Goodeniaceae and is endemic to the Kimberley region of Western Australia. It is an erect, annual or ephemeral herb with narrow egg-shaped stem-leaves and panicles of purple or maroon flowers with a yellow centre.

Description
Flowering occurs from May to June and the fruit is a more or less spherical capsule  in diameter.

Taxonomy and naming
Goodenia inundata was first formally described in 2001 by Leigh William Sage and Julian Patrick Pigott in the journal Nuytsia from specimens collected near the Kalumburu Road in 1993. The specific epithet (inundata) means "flooded", referring to the seasonally inundated habitat of this goodenia.

Distribution and habitat
This goodenia grows in seasonally wet places in the north-west of the Northern Kimberley biogeographic region of Western Australia.

Conservation status
Goodenia inundata is classified as "Priority Two" by the Western Australian Government Department of Parks and Wildlife meaning that it is poorly known and from only one or a few locations.

References

inundata
Eudicots of Western Australia
Plants described in 2001
Endemic flora of Western Australia